Luc Steins (born 22 March 1995) is a Dutch handball player for Paris Saint-Germain and the Dutch national team.

He represented the Netherlands at the 2020 and 2022 European Men's Handball Championship. He was in the all-star team of the latter tournament.

Individual awards
All-Star centre back of the European Championship: 2022
All-Star centre back of LNH Division 1: 2020–21, 2021–22
Most Valuable Player (MVP) of LNH Division 1: 2020–21, 2021–22

References

External links

1995 births
Living people
Dutch male handball players
People from Voerendaal
Expatriate handball players
Dutch expatriate sportspeople in France
Sportspeople from Limburg (Netherlands)